The 2014 BeNe Ladies Tour is the first edition of the BeNe Ladies Tour, a women's cycling stage race in the Netherlands. It is rated by the UCI as a category 2.2 race and is held between 19 and 20 July 2014.

Stages

Stage 1
19 July 2014 – Sint-Laureins to Sint-Laureins,

Stage 2a
20 July 2014, – Philippine to Philippine (individual time trial),

Stage 2b
20 July 2014 – Philippine to Philippine,

Classification leadership

See also

 2014 in women's road cycling

References

2014 in women's road cycling
2014 in French sport